Kemerovo tickborne viral fever is an aparalytic febrile illness accompanied by meningism following tick-bite.  The causative agent is a zoonotic Orbivirus first described in 1963 in western Siberia by Mikhail Chumakov and coworkers.  The virus has some 23 serotypes, and can occur in coinfections with other Orbiviruses and tick-transmitted encephalitis viruses, complicating the course of illness.  Rodents and birds are the primary vertebrate hosts of the virus; Ixodes persulcatus ticks are a vector of the virus. Kemerovo and related viruses may be translocated distances in the environment by migratory birds.

References

Orbiviruses
Arthropod-borne viral fevers and viral haemorrhagic fevers